This is a list of mines in Manitoba, Canada. Operational mines are bolded.

Hudson Bay Mine
Copper, Zinc, Gold
Flin Flon, Manitoba

Man